The Antigua and Barbuda Defense Force Air Wing was founded on 12 April 2022, and currently has a fleet of 1 aircraft, a Britten-Norman BN-2 Islander.

The Air Wing has expressed interest in acquiring a helicopter, and other aircraft.

Currently, the Air Wing is based in the Calvin Air hangar at V.C. Bird International Airport, but will soon move to another hangar at the same airport.

References 

Military of Antigua and Barbuda